STS-99 was a Space Shuttle mission using Endeavour, that launched on 11 February 2000 from Kennedy Space Center, Florida. The primary objective of the mission was the Shuttle Radar Topography Mission (SRTM) project. This was also the last solo flight of Endeavour; all future flights for Endeavour became devoted to the International Space Station. STS-99 was also the first Shuttle mission of the 2000s.

Crew

Mission highlights

The Shuttle Radar Topography Mission (SRTM) was an international project spearheaded by the National Imagery and Mapping Agency (now the National Geospatial-Intelligence Agency), an agency within the U.S. Department of Defense, and NASA, with participation of the German Aerospace Center DLR. Its objective was to obtain the most complete high-resolution digital topographic database of the Earth. SRTM consisted of a specially modified radar system that flew onboard Endeavour during its 11-day mission. This radar system gathered around 8 terabytes of data to produce high-quality 3-D images of the Earth's surface.

SRTM used C-band and X-band interferometric synthetic aperture radar (IFSAR) to acquire topographic data of Earth's land mass (between 60°N and 56°S). It produced digital topographic map products which met Interferometric Terrain Height Data (ITHD)-2 specifications (30 meter x 30 meter spatial sampling with 16 meter absolute vertical height accuracy, 10 meter relative vertical height accuracy and 20 meter absolute horizontal circular accuracy). The result of the Shuttle Radar Topography Mission was close to 1 trillion measurements of the Earth's topography. Besides contributing to the production of better maps, these measurements could lead to improved water drainage modeling, more realistic flight simulators, better locations for cell phone towers, and enhanced navigation safety.

The Shuttle Radar Topography Mission mast was deployed successfully to its full length, and the antenna was turned to its operation position. After a successful checkout of the radar systems, mapping began at 00:31 EST, less than 12 hours after launch. Crewmembers split into two shifts so they could work around the clock, and began mapping an area from 60 degrees north to 56 degrees south. Data was sent to the Jet Propulsion Laboratory for analysis, and early indications showed the data to be of excellent quality.

Mapping proceeded fairly smoothly, but during an attitude-hold period for payload mapping during the second day of flight, it was determined that orbiter propellant usage had doubled from 0.07 to 0.15% an hour. The increase was caused by a failure of the payload cold-gas thrust system that was used to offset the gravity gradient torque of the mast. As a result of this failure, orbiter propellant was being used at a higher-than-planned rate to maintain the attitude of the vehicle. Measures to reduce the expenditure were evaluated and based on the analysis, enough propellant could be saved to complete the planned 9-day plus science mission.

The first of a series of "flycast" maneuvers during the mission was also made on the second day of flight. The flycast maneuver was designed to reduce strain on the almost  mast extending from Endeavours payload bay when adjustments to Endeavours orbit were needed.

The orbiter, which flew tail-first during mapping operations, was moved to a nose-first attitude with the mast extending upward. A brief reaction control system pulse began the maneuver. This caused the mast to deflect slightly backwards then rebound forward. As it reached vertical, a stronger thrust was applied, arresting the mast's motion and increasing the orbiter's speed.

Radar data gathering concluded at 06:54 EST on the tenth day of flight after a final sweep across Australia. During 222 hours and 23 minutes of mapping, Endeavours radar images filled 332 high density tapes and covered 99.98% of the planned mapping area – land between 60 degrees north latitude and 56 degrees south latitude – at least once and 94.6% of it twice. Enough data was gathered to fill the equivalent of 20,000 CDs.

Also aboard Endeavour was a student experiment called EarthKAM, which took 2,715 digital photos during the mission through an overhead flight-deck window. The NASA-sponsored program allowed middle school students to select photo targets and receive the images via the Internet. The pictures were used in classroom projects on Earth science, geography, mathematics and space science. More than 75 middle schools around the world participated in the experiment, which set a record. On four previous flights combined, EarthKAM sent down a total of 2,018 images.

STS-99 also saw the recommissioning of the Spacelab pallet system, despite the Spacelab system being discontinued almost two years prior.

The 2007 Smithsonian Networks documentary Oasis Earth was made about the mission, containing HD video from inside Endeavour, including many views looking at the Earth below. One highlight of the documentary features Mamoru Mohri shooting video of the Moon and Mount Fuji.

This was the last mission to fly with the original Space Shuttle cockpit layout in 18 straight years. Although the next mission (STS-101) featured the "glass cockpit" on Atlantis, Endeavour and sister orbiter Discovery continued flying with the original cockpit layout until after the Columbia disaster.

Wake-up calls 
NASA began a tradition of playing music to astronauts during the Gemini program, which was first used to wake up a flight crew during Apollo 15.
Each track is specially chosen, often by their families, and usually has a special meaning to an individual member of the crew, or is applicable to their daily activities.

See also

 List of human spaceflights
 List of Space Shuttle missions
 Outline of space science

References

External links

 NASA mission summary 
 STS-99 Video Highlights 
 USGS: Shuttle Radar Topography Mission (SRTM) Fact Sheet 2009-3087 (Sep 2009)

STS-099
Spacecraft launched in 2000
2000 in the United States
2000 in Florida